Holavanahalli is a village  located in the southern state of Karnataka, India. It is located in the Koratagere taluk of Tumkur district in Karnataka.

Demographics

Population of Holavanahalli (According to India Census 2001)

See also
 Tumkur
 Districts of Karnataka

References

External links
 http://Tumkur.nic.in/

Villages in Tumkur district